Schede is a river of South Lower Saxony, Germany, in the district of Göttingen. Münden).

See also
List of rivers of Lower Saxony

References 

Rivers of Lower Saxony
Bramwald
Rivers of Germany